
Gmina Nowy Korczyn is a rural gmina (administrative district) in Busko County, Świętokrzyskie Voivodeship, in south-central Poland.

The gmina contains part of the protected area called Nida Landscape Park.

Villages
Gmina Nowy Korczyn contains the villages and settlements of Badrzychowice, Błotnowola, Brzostków, Czarkowy, Górnowola, Grotniki Duże, Grotniki Małe, Harmoniny, Kawęczyn, Łęka, Nowy Korczyn, Ostrowce, Parchocin, Pawłów, Piasek Wielki, Podraje, Podzamcze, Rzegocin, Sępichów, Stary Korczyn, Strożyska, Ucisków, Winiary Dolne and Żukowice.

Neighbouring gminas
Gmina Nowy Korczyn is bordered by the gminas of Bolesław, Busko-Zdrój, Gręboszów, Mędrzechów, Opatowiec, Pacanów, Solec-Zdrój and Wiślica.

References
 Polish official population figures 2006

Nowy Korczyn
Busko County